Heathrow Terminal 5 is a shared railway and London Underground station serving Heathrow Terminal 5. It serves as a terminus for Heathrow Express services to Paddington, and for Elizabeth line and London Underground Piccadilly line services to central London. It is managed and staffed by Heathrow Express.

The London Underground section of the station is situated in Travelcard Zone 6; it is the westernmost below-ground station on the network. It is also the westernmost National Rail station in London.

History
Following the longest public inquiry ever undertaken in the UK, construction of the station was granted in November 2001 by transport minister Stephen Byers as part of the approval of the Heathrow Terminal 5 project. Funded by British Airport Authority (BAA), construction of the extension as part of the T5 construction took 6 years. As part of the construction, Heathrow Terminal 4 tube station was closed for 20 months between January 2005 and September 2006 to allow the connecting junctions to be constructed.
Train testing started when the extension was handed over to London Underground on 18 July 2007.

The station opened on 27 March 2008 coinciding with that of Heathrow Terminal 5. It was designed by architects HOK in conjunction with Rogers Stirk Harbour + Partners. Although situated underground, parts of the station's roofing are made of translucent ETFE laminate panels, allowing natural daylight to flood down both ends of all six platforms. 

Since May 2022, Heathrow Terminal 5 has been served by the Elizabeth line.

Services

Terminal 5 station is the only one at Heathrow Airport where Heathrow Express, Elizabeth line and Piccadilly line services share the same station. The following rail services are provided:
Piccadilly line from platforms 1 and 2: half the trains on the Heathrow branch terminate here, via Hatton Cross and Heathrow Terminals 2 & 3. The other half do not serve Heathrow Terminal 5, running instead via the loop to service Heathrow Terminal 4 and Heathrow Terminals 2 & 3, before returning eastbound.
Heathrow Express terminus to and from Paddington station from platforms 3 and 4.
Elizabeth line terminus to and from Abbey Wood station from platforms 3 and 4.

Free intra-terminal transfers
Until 2012, free transfer was not possible between terminals via the Underground, unlike on the Heathrow Express. In January 2012, free travel was introduced for Oyster card and contactless payment card holders between the Heathrow stations on the Piccadilly line. Journeys from Heathrow Terminal 5 to Terminal 4 via the Piccadilly line require a change at Hatton Cross; this journey is free, despite Hatton Cross not being part of the free travel zone.

Future links

The proposal is currently at consultation stage and remains unconfirmed.

In addition to the above rail links, Terminal 5 station also has two safeguarded "heavy rail" platforms for use by a west-facing connection to the National Rail network. The south-leaning proposal would spur off the Waterloo to Reading Line west of Staines railway station (originally dubbed Heathrow Airtrack, with a newer proposal named Heathrow Southern Railway). It proposes direct rail services to London Waterloo, Reading, Woking, Guildford and Gatwick Airport. Due to the cost of replacing three level crossings, one in a very urban part of Egham, the proposals are currently unfunded.

Connections
London Buses routes 350, 423, 482, 490 and night route N9 serve the station. First Berkshire & The Thames Valley, National Express and Oxford Bus Company also operate connecting bus and coach services.

References

External links 

 
 Proposed AirTrack Rail Link

Piccadilly line stations
London Underground Night Tube stations
Tube stations in the London Borough of Hillingdon
Railway stations in the London Borough of Hillingdon
Railway stations opened by Network Rail
Railway stations in Great Britain opened in 2008
Railway stations served by Heathrow Express
Airport railway stations in the United Kingdom
5 tube station
Railway stations located underground in the United Kingdom
2008 establishments in England
Railway stations served by the Elizabeth line